Winchester Public Schools may refer to:
 Winchester Public Schools (Connecticut)
 Winchester Public Schools (Virginia)